A Mind of Her Own is a British film released in 2006. Based on a true story, the film is directed, produced, and written by Owen Carey Jones and stars Nicky Talacko as Sophie and Amanda Rawnsley as Becky.

Plot
Sophie dreams of going to medical school but is discouraged by virtually everyone as she struggles with dyslexia. Encouraged by her friend Becky, Sophie eventually puts herself through college and graduate school and helps develop a cure for paralysis.

Awards
2005 Heartland Film Festival: Crystal Heart Award, Best Feature film; Best actress (Nicky Talacko)
2005 Monaco International Film Festival: Angel Award, Best Newcomer (Nicky Talacko); Best Supporting Actress (Amanda Rawnsley)

See also
List of artistic depictions of dyslexia

External links
 
 
 British Films Catalog
DVD

2006 films
Dyslexia in fiction
British drama films
2006 drama films
British films based on actual events
2000s English-language films
2000s British films